Novopavlovka may refer to:
Novopavlovka, Kyrgyzstan, a village in Chuy Province of Kyrgyzstan
Novopavlovka, Russia, name of several inhabited localities in Russia